The Church of the Transfiguration, also known as the Little Church Around the Corner, is an Episcopal parish church located at 1 East 29th Street, between Madison and Fifth Avenues in the NoMad neighborhood of Manhattan, New York City. The congregation was founded in 1848 by George Hendric Houghton and worshiped in a home at 48 East 29th Street until the church was built and consecrated in 1849.

The church was designed in the early English Neo-Gothic style; the architect has not been identified. The sanctuary is set back from the street behind a garden which creates a facsimile of the English countryside and which has long been an oasis for New Yorkers, who relax in the garden, pray in the chapel, or enjoy free weekday concerts in the main church. The complex has grown somewhat haphazardly over the years, and for this reason it is sometimes called the "Holy Cucumber Vine". The sanctuary had a guildhall, transepts, and a tower added to it in 1852, and the lych-gate, designed by Frederick Clarke Withers, was built in 1896. Chapels were added in 1906 (lady chapel) and 1908 (mortuary chapel). The Edwin Booth memorial stained glass window (1898) is by John LaFarge. Other stained glass windows are by Karl Stecher.

In 1967, the church was designated a New York City landmark, and it was listed on the National Register of Historic Places in 1973.

Early years 
The church has been a leader of the Anglo-Catholic movement within the Episcopal Church from its founding. While this movement is often associated with elaborate worship, it also has stressed service to the poor and oppressed from its earliest days. In 1863, during the Civil War Draft Riots, Houghton gave sanctuary to African Americans who were under attack, filling up the church's sanctuary, schoolroom, library and vestry. When rioters showed up at the church, Houghton turned them away and dispersed them by saying, "You white devils, you! Do you know nothing of the spirit of Christ?"

Ties to the theater 
Actors were among the social outcasts whom Houghton befriended. In 1870, William T. Sabine, the rector of the nearby Church of the Atonement, which is no longer extant, refused to conduct funeral services for an actor named George Holland, suggesting, "I believe there is a little church around the corner where they do that sort of thing."  Joseph Jefferson, a fellow actor who was trying to arrange Holland's burial, exclaimed, "If that be so, God bless the little church around the corner!" and the church began a longstanding association with the theater.

P. G. Wodehouse, when living in Greenwich Village as a young writer of novels and lyrics for musicals, married his wife Ethel at the Little Church in September 1914. Subsequently, Wodehouse would set most of his fictionalized weddings at the church; and the hit musical Sally that he wrote with Jerome Kern and Guy Bolton ended with the company singing, in tribute to the Bohemian congregation: "Dear little, dear little Church 'Round the Corner / Where so many lives have begun, / Where folks without money see nothing that's funny / In two living cheaper than one."

In 1923, the Episcopal Actors' Guild held its first meeting at Transfiguration. Such theatrical greats as Basil Rathbone, Tallulah Bankhead, Peggy Wood, Joan Fontaine, Rex Harrison, Barnard Hughes, and Charlton Heston have served as officers or council members of the guild. The Little Church's association with the theatre continued in the 1970s, when it hosted the Joseph Jefferson Theatre Company, which gave starts to actors such as Armand Assante, Tom Hulce, and Rhea Perlman.

As well as being a guild officer, Sir Rex Harrison was memorialized at the church upon his death in 1990. Maggie Smith, Brendan Gill, and Harrison's sons, Carey and Noel, spoke at the service.

Recent history 
The Little Church Around the Corner is known for the long service of its rectors: in the 150 years from its founding to 1998, there were only five. The Reverend Jackson Harvelle Randolph Ray (June 11, 1886 – June 1963), for instance, was rector from 1923 to 1963. The parish is currently under the rectorate of Father John David van Dooren, who was called as rector in 2017.

In 2021, the church reported 193 members, average attendance of 56, and $231,772 in plate and pledge income.

Music program 
The church has long been associated with a program of free music performances. The Anglican tradition of a men's and boys' choir has been maintained with special music for concerts and summer services provided by a choir of mixed voices. In 1988, the Arnold Schwartz Memorial organ, a new tracker pipe organ, was built and installed at the church by C. B. Fisk, Inc.

In popular culture
 A key scene—a wedding between characters played by Neil Hamilton and Mary Brian—in the 1925 Herbert Brenon–directed silent film The Street of Forgotten Men was shot at the church.
 The church is alluded to at least twice in James Joyce's Finnegans Wake, as "tin choorch round the coroner" (67.13) and "ye litel church rond ye corner" (533.23–4).
 In 1986, the church was featured in an episode of The Equalizer titled "Shades of Darkness".
 In Woody Allen's Hannah and Her Sisters, Allen attends a concert in the main sanctuary while attempting to convert to Catholicism.

Gallery

References

External links 

 

1848 establishments in New York (state)
19th-century Episcopal church buildings
Anglo-Catholic church buildings in the United States
Churches completed in 1849
Churches in Manhattan
Episcopal church buildings in New York City
Gothic Revival church buildings in New York City
Murray Hill, Manhattan
New York City Designated Landmarks in Manhattan
Church of the Transfiguration
Religious organizations established in 1848